The Exarchate of Ravenna or of Italy was a lordship of the Eastern Roman Empire (Byzantine Empire) in Italy, from 584 to 751, when the last exarch was put to death by the Lombards. It was one of two exarchates established following the western reconquests under Emperor Justinian to more effectively administer the territories, along with the Exarchate of Africa.

Introduction
Ravenna became the capital of the Western Roman Empire in 402 under Honorius due to its fine harbour with access to the Adriatic and its ideal defensive location amidst impassable marshes. The city remained the capital of the Empire until 476, when it became the capital of Odoacer, and then of the Ostrogoths under Theodoric the Great.

It remained the capital of the Ostrogothic Kingdom but, in 540 during the Gothic War (535–554), Ravenna was occupied by the Byzantine general Belisarius. After this reconquest it became the seat of the provincial governor. At that time, the administrative structure of Italy followed, with some modifications, the old system established by Emperor Diocletian, and retained by Odoacer and the Goths.

Lombard invasion and Byzantine reaction 
In 568, the Lombards under King Alboin, together with other Germanic allies, invaded Northern Italy. The area had only a few years ago been completely pacified, and had suffered greatly during the long Gothic War. The local Byzantine forces were weak and, after taking several towns, in 569 the Lombards conquered Milan. They took Pavia after a three-year siege in 572 and made it their capital. In subsequent years, they took Tuscany. Others, under Faroald and Zotto, penetrated into Central and Southern Italy, where they established the duchies of Spoleto and Benevento. However, after Alboin's murder in 573, the Lombards fragmented into several autonomous duchies (the "Rule of the Dukes").

Emperor Justin II tried to take advantage of this: in 576 he sent his son-in-law, Baduarius, to Italy. However, he was defeated and killed in battle, and the continuing crises in the Balkans and the East meant that another imperial effort at reconquest was not possible. Because of the Lombard incursions, the Roman possessions had fragmented into several isolated territories. In 580, Emperor Tiberius II reorganized them into five province eparchies: the Annonaria in northern Italy around Ravenna, Calabria, Campania, Emilia and Liguria, and the Urbicaria around the city of Rome (Urbs). Thus by the end of the 6th century the new order of powers had settled into a stable pattern. Ravenna, governed by its exarch, who held civil and military authority in addition to his ecclesiastical office, was confined to the city, its port and environs as far north as the Po (bordering territory of the duke of Venice, nominally in imperial service) and south to the Marecchia River, beyond which lay the Duchy of the Pentapolis on the Adriatic, also under a duke nominally representing the Emperor of the East.

Exarchate
The exarchate was organised into a group of duchies (Rome, Venetia, Calabria, Naples, Perugia, Pentapolis, Lucania, etc.) that were mainly the coastal cities in the Italian peninsula since the Lombards held the advantage in the hinterland.

The civil and military head of these imperial possessions, the exarch himself, was the representative at Ravenna of the emperor in Constantinople. The surrounding territory reached from the River Po, which served as the boundary with Venice in the north, to the Pentapolis at Rimini in the south, the border of the "five cities" in the Marches along the Adriatic coast, and reached even cities not on the coast, such as Forlì. All this territory, which lay on the eastern flank of the Apennines, was under the exarch's direct administration and formed the Exarchate in the strictest sense. From the perspective of Constantinople, the Exarchate consisted of the province of Italy.

The Exarchate of Ravenna was not the sole Byzantine province in Italy. Byzantine Sicily formed a separate government, and Corsica and Sardinia, while they remained Byzantine, belonged to the Exarchate of Africa.

The Lombards had their capital at Pavia and controlled the great valley of the Po. The Lombard wedge in Italy spread to the south, and established duchies at Spoleto and Beneventum; they controlled the interior, while Byzantine governors more or less controlled the coasts.

Piedmont, Lombardy, the interior mainland of Venetia, Tuscany and the interior of Campania belonged to the Lombards, and bit by bit the Imperial representative in Italy lost all genuine power, though in name he controlled areas like Liguria (completely lost in 640 to the Lombards), or Naples and Calabria (being overrun by the Lombard duchy of Benevento). In Rome, the pope was the real master.

At the end, 740, the Exarchate consisted of Istria, Venetia, Ferrara, Ravenna (the exarchate in the limited sense), with the Pentapolis, and Perugia.

These fragments of the province of Italy, as it was when reconquered for Justinian, were almost all lost, either to the Lombards, who finally conquered Ravenna itself in 751, or by the revolt of the pope, who finally separated from the Empire on the issue of the iconoclastic reforms.

The relationship between the Pope in Rome and the Exarch in Ravenna was a dynamic that could hurt or help the empire. The Papacy could be a vehicle for local discontent. The old Roman senatorial aristocracy resented being governed by an Exarch who was considered by many a meddlesome foreigner. Thus the exarch faced threats from outside as well as from within, hampering much real progress and development.

In its internal history, the exarchate was subject to the splintering influences that were leading to the subdivision of sovereignty and the establishment of feudalism throughout Europe. Step by step, and in spite of the efforts of the emperors at Constantinople, the great imperial officials became local landowners, the lesser owners of land were increasingly kinsmen or at least associates of these officials, and new allegiances intruded on the sphere of imperial administration. Meanwhile, the necessity for providing for the defence of the imperial territories against the Lombards led to the formation of local militias, who at first were attached to the imperial regiments, but gradually became independent, as they were recruited entirely locally. Other cities of the exarchate were organized on the same model.

End of the Exarchate
During the 6th and 7th centuries, the growing menace of the Lombards and the Franks, as well as the split between Eastern and Western Christendom inspired both by iconoclastic emperors and medieval developments in Latin theology and culminating in the acrimonious rivalry between the Pope of Rome and the Patriarch of Constantinople, made the position of the exarch more and more untenable. Ravenna remained the seat of the exarch until the revolt of 727 over iconoclasm. Eutychius, the last exarch of Ravenna, was killed by the Lombards in 751. 

In 752, the northeastern portion of the Exarchate known as the Ducatus Pentapolis was conquered by King Aistulf of the Lombards. Four years later, after the Franks drove the Lombards out, Pope Stephen II claimed the territory. The Pope's ally in the military action against the Lombards, Pepin the Younger, King of the Franks, then donated the conquered lands back to the Papacy; this donation, which was confirmed by Pepin's son Charlemagne in 774, marked the beginning of the temporal power of the popes as the Patrimony of Saint Peter. The archbishoprics within the former exarchate, however, had developed traditions of local secular power and independence, which contributed to the fragmenting localization of powers. Three centuries later, that independence would fuel the rise of the independent communes.

The southern portions of the exarchate including the imperial possessions at Naples, Calabria, and Apulia were reorganized as the Catepanate of Italy headquartered in Bari. These territories were ultimately lost to the Saracen Berbers in 847 but recovered in 871. Later after Sicily was conquered by Arabs the remnants were placed into newly established military/administrative themes of Calabria and Langobardia. Istria at the head of the Adriatic was attached to Dalmatia.

Exarchs of Ravenna
Note: For some exarchs there exists some uncertainty over their exact tenure dates.

Decius (584–585)
Smaragdus (585–589)
Romanus (589–596)
Callinicus (596–603)
Smaragdus (603–608)
John I (608–616)
Eleutherius (616–619)
Isaac (625–643)
Theodore I Calliopas (643–645)
Plato (645–649)
Olympius (649–652)
Theodore I Calliopas (653 – c. 666)
Gregory (c. 666)
Theodore II (678–687)
John II Platyn (687–702)
Theophylactus (702–710)
John III Rizocopus (710–711)
Scholasticus (713–723)
Paul (723 to 726–727)
Eutychius (726-727 to 751)

Citations

References 

 
 
 
 
 

 

 
 

 
6th-century establishments in the Byzantine Empire
8th-century disestablishments in the Byzantine Empire
Ravenna
Ravenna, Exarchate of
6th century in the Byzantine Empire
7th century in the Byzantine Empire
8th century in the Byzantine Empire
States and territories disestablished in the 8th century
584 establishments
751 disestablishments
History of Istria